Clássica Aldeias do Xisto is a one-day road cycling race held annually from 2017 to 2018 He was part of the UCI Europe Tour in category 1.2. 
held annually from 2017 to 2018 He was part of the UCI Europe Tour in category 1.2

Winners

References

Cycle races in Portugal
UCI Europe Tour races
Recurring sporting events established in 2017